Malakai Daylan Hinckson-Mars (born 1 December 1998) is an English professional footballer who last played for Farnborough as a forward.

Career
Mars began his career with Barnet, before joining Chelsea as an under-16 in November 2014. He signed a scholarship in July 2015, and he spent time with Crystal Palace on a youth loan later that season. He turned professional with Chelsea in June 2016, signing a two-year contract. He joined Derby County on loan in January 2017, before returning to Barnet in August 2017 for an undisclosed fee. He made his professional debut on 23 September 2017, coming on as a substitute in a league match against Crawley Town. He joined Farnborough on loan in March 2018. He then joined Hanwell Town on loan on 6 November 2018. He was released by the Bees at the end of the 2018–19 season. Mars joined Cockfosters in September 2019. Mars played one game for Badshot Lea in November 2019 - in which he scored twice - before re-joining Farnborough later that month.

Career statistics

References

1998 births
People from Enfield, London
Living people
English footballers
Barnet F.C. players
Chelsea F.C. players
Crystal Palace F.C. players
Derby County F.C. players
Farnborough F.C. players
Hanwell Town F.C. players
Cockfosters F.C. players
Badshot Lea F.C. players
English Football League players
Southern Football League players
Isthmian League players
Association football forwards
Black British sportspeople